The statue of Charles James Fox stands at the north end of Bloomsbury Square in the London borough of Camden. Erected in 1816, the sculptor was Richard Westmacott. It commemorates the Whig politician who died in 1806. Fox is shown in the garb of a Roman senator.  The statue is a Grade II* listed structure.

History 
Charles James Fox (24 January 1749 – 13 September 1806), enjoyed a political career of nearly forty years. Rarely holding office, he championed a range of liberal causes, including American independence, the French Revolution, Catholic Emancipation and the abolition of slavery. Personally dissolute, with weaknesses for women, gambling and alcohol, he died, heavily in debt, at the age of 57. His career has been described as of "almost unrelieved failure" but his generosity of mind, his famed charm and his "genius for friendship" left his many friends and admirers desolate at his death. As well as paying for his funeral, clearing his debts, and funding a pension for his widow, they raised the considerable sum of £12,450 for a memorial. The sum was sufficient to allow for two, a statue in Westminster Abbey, and that located in Bloomsbury Square. The site was given by John Russell, 6th Duke of Bedford, son of Fox's great friend, the 5th Duke. The sculptor was Richard Westmacott and the statue was completed in 1814 and raised in 1816.

Description 
The statue is of bronze and shows Fox in the robes of a Roman senator. He is seated, reputedly as his friends considered that a realistic portrayal of a standing Fox would have appeared undignified, due to his corpulence. Fox holds a copy of Magna Carta, symbolising his commitment to liberty. The statue stands on a granite plinth which is carved with Fox's full name and the date of the statue's erection. The plinth itself is raised on a four-staged pedestal base.

The statue was designated a Grade II listed structure in 1951. It was promoted to a Grade II* listing on 23 August 2008, UNESCO's International Day for the Remembrance of the Slave Trade and its Abolition, though the statue does not explicitly reference Fox's championing of the abolitionist cause.

Notes

References

Sources

External links
 

Sculptures by Richard Westmacott
Bronze sculptures in the United Kingdom
Buildings and structures completed in 1814
Grade II* listed buildings in the London Borough of Camden
Grade II* listed statues in London
Monuments and memorials in London
Outdoor sculptures in London
Sculptures of men in the United Kingdom
Fox
Fox
Fox